Uru Harbour Airport , or Atoifi Airport, is a private airport located in Atoifi, Malaita, Solomon Islands.

Airlines and destinations

References

Airports in the Solomon Islands